The Zanj Empire was a 19th-century political formation established by the Omani sultanate on the Swahili Coast. Known for its slave-trading activities in conjunction with the local Swahili people, at its peak, the polity's reach stretched as far as Eastern Congo. Eventually, the "Empire" collapsed when the British, intent on ending the slave trade, overtook it and incorporated it into the British Empire in 1896.

See also
 Shirazi (ethnic group)

Sources
Periplus Maris Erythraei (translated and edited by Lionel Casson). Princeton: Princeton University Press, 1989.
Reusch, Richard. History of East Africa. New York: Ungar, 1961.
Mathew, Gervase (edited by Gervase Mathew and Roland Oliver). The East African Coast until the Coming of the Portuguese, History of East Africa. Oxford: Oxford University Press, 1963.

Arab diaspora in Africa
Former empires
Omani diaspora